Jolly Little Elves is a 1934 animated short film by Walter Lantz. The cartoon was nominated at the 7th Academy Awards for Best Animated Short Film. The short was part of Lantz's Cartune Classics series.

Summary

It is a retelling of The Elves and the Shoemaker with the elves this time loving to eat donuts and drink coffee.

References

External links 
 
 
 Jolly Little Elves on MUBI

1934 films
Films about elves
Universal Pictures animated short films
Walter Lantz Productions shorts
1934 animated films
1930s animated short films
1930s American animated films